The 1st Armoured Division is a unit of the French Army formed during World War II that took part in the May-June 1940 Battle of France.

History 
Formed 16 January 1940 at Châlons-sur-Marne. Missing half of its motorcycles and artillery caissons on 10 May 1940. Division took serious losses on 15-16 May and lost all of its tanks. It had to be reformed from 31 May until 4 June. Campaigns: Battle of the Meuse, Battle of the North, Battle of the Somme and Retreat of the Center. Division disbanded in July and August 1940. Final command post at Le Dognon, northeast of Limoges. Subordination: XI Corps of the 9th Army until 17 May, 6th Army from 1–25 June.

Composition 

In May 1940:

 28th Tank Battalion (B1 bis tanks)
 37th Tank Battalion (B1 bis tanks)
 25th Tank Battalion (H39 tanks)
 26th Tank Battalion (H39 tanks)
 5th Motorized Rifle Battalion (bataillon de chasseurs portés)
 305th Artillery Regiment

References

Bibliography 

 (GUF) Service Historique de l'Armée de Terre. Guerre 1939–1945 Les Grandes Unités Françaises. Paris: Imprimerie Nationale, 1967.

French World War II divisions
Armored divisions of France
Military units and formations established in 1940
Military units and formations disestablished in 1940